Kinkomaa is an urban area in Muurame, Finland. It is the fastest-growing urban area in the municipality.

Gallery

References

Muurame